Homeboyz Rugby Football Club is a rugby union club based in Nairobi, Kenya, that competes in the Kenya Cup, Eric Shirley Shield, Enterprise Cup and Mwamba Cup. Formed in 2009, Homeboyz also has a women's team that competes in the Kenya Rugby Football Union women's league every year. Both the men's and women's teams also compete in the Kenya National Sevens Circuit that happens annually. Their main home ground is Jamhuri Park.

History

Foundation and early years
Homeboyz was officially founded in 2009. This was a result of the perceived need in the market to accommodate the younger players who felt that they were not being given enough opportunities to play competitive rugby. As a start-up team in 2009, Homeboyz RFC was initially placed in the lower-tier Eric Shirley Shield. After winning the Eric Shirley Shield two seasons in a row, they earned their promotion to Kenya Cup.

The women's team was formed in 2016 after Homeboyz decided to give women a platform to showcase their talent. The women's game is still relatively young but has made great strides in the past years. The team has been consistent in the Kenya Rugby Football Union women's league and produced five women who represented the country in the 2016 Summer Olympics.

Tours

Against Uganda Select
Homeboyz first toured Uganda in 2018 having won the Enterprise Cup to face a Ugandan Select side as an initiative to promote rugby in the region. They won the match 18 - 10 with Bush Mwale and Roy Wesonga scoring a try each and Kelvin Masai kicking over two penalties and a conversion.

Dubai 7s
Homeboyz first toured Dubai in 2010 to play in the Dubai 7's Men's Invitational Tournament. This was after taking part in three of the five legs of the National Sevens Circuit and winning over many fans.

In 2018, Homeboyz won three legs of the National Sevens Circuit which saw them crowned 7's champions that season. This was rewarded by a trip to the Dubai 7's Men's Invitational Tournament once again where the side narrowly lost to the Emerging Boks.

Club success (2009–2019)
In 2009, Homeboyz had a stint in the National Sevens Circuit playing in three of the five tournaments of the circuit. Homeboyz RFC played the Prinsloo Sevens (Nakuru), Driftwoods Sevens (Mombasa) and in the Kabeberi Sevens (Nairobi) where they won their first trophy in the shield category.

In 2010, Homeboyz Rugby participated in their first 15's fixture playing in the Eric Shirley Shield, which they won in their inaugural year. Homeboyz were crowned champions after a win against Kisumu RFC at the University of Nairobi grounds. They were not promoted to play in the Kenya Cup due to some technicalities. 

In 2011, the team went ahead and defended the Eric Shirley Shield trophy to secure a chance to play in the highest league in the country, Kenya Cup. The same year also saw Homeboyz win the Mwamba Cup.

In 2013, Homeboyz Rugby finished 4th in the National Sevens Circuit winning their first sevens main cup trophy, the Kabeberi 7s. 

In 2014, Homeboyz missed the Kenya Cup playoff place by a single point. That same year they bagged their second sevens main cup trophy by lifting the Driftwood 7's and finishing second overall in the National Sevens Circuit.

In the 2015 Enterprise Cup, the team reaches its first senior final in the Enterprise Cup losing 28 - 0 to KCB. 

In 2016, Homeboyz Rugby won the overall National Sevens Circuit, setting a record for playing in all the finals in a six leg format and winning three of them, Prinsloo 7's, Dala 7's and Nanyuki 7's.

In 2017, Homeboyz Rugby, finished third overall in the National Sevens Circuit having won the Driftwood 7's and Dala 7's in the process. That same year saw them reach the Kenya Cup semi final for the first time after finishing the regular season in position one.

In 2018, they won the Enterprise Cup, beating Impala Saracens 21 - 3 at the RFUEA Ground. That same year saw Homeboyz reclaim the overall National Sevens Circuit, winning four, Prinsloo 7's, Sepetuka 7's, Kabeberi 7's and Christie 7's, of the six legs on offer. They also had a decent run in the Kenya Cup, finishing second in the regular season before falling to Kabras 29 - 13 in the semi final.

Current standings

Kenya Cup

Eric Shirley Shield

2020 Enterprise Cup

2020 Mwamba Cup

Colours and crest

The blue and yellow that are famous with the club is adopted from the club sponsor, Homeboyz Entertainment Limited. The current crest was remodeled in November 2015 and retained the Homeboyz logo and the blue and yellow colors. 

The current kit is made by Samurai Sportswear. Homeboyz Entertainment was the primary kit sponsor from 2009 to 2015 with its brands H2O and HBR 103.5 FM featuring in front of their jersey. In the 2015/16 season, Menengai Cream took over as the primary kit sponsor featuring in front of the jersey until the 2018/19 season.

Squad

Coaching and management staff

Current squad

Academy squad

Women's squad

Coaches

Homeboyz were coached in their first season by Eric Situma, who was assisted by Paul Murunga. Situma was replaced by Murunga in 2011 who had several assistants that included Benjamin Ayimba, Bill Githinji, and former Homeboyz players Elisha Okello and Simon Odongo. Murunga continued as coach until he was appointed Kenya Sevens coach after the 2017 season. Simon Odongo took over the reins for the 2018 season and didn't have an assistant during that time. In 2019, Sharks Academy coach, Jason Hector, was announced as the Homeboyz head coach. Jason was assisted by Simon Odongo in the season that was canceled owing to the COVID-19 pandemic. Jason was appointed head coach of the Western Province Rugby Academy Claremont Campus for the 2021 season.

Current coaches
 Simon Odongo (Backs)
 Elisha Okello (Forwards)

Former coaches

Notable players

Olympians

The following Homeboyz players represented Kenya at the 2020 Summer Olympics:

 
 Alvin Otieno
 Jeff Oluoch
 Sheila Kavugwe Chajira
 Cynthia Atieno
 Leah Wambui

The following Homeboyz players represented Kenya at the 2016 Summer Olympics:

 
 Oscar Ayodi
 Bush Mwale
 Lugonzo Ligamy
 Sheila Kavugwe Chajira
 Janet Awuor Awino
 Irene Awino Otieno
 Linet Arasa
 Rachael Adhiambo Mbogo

Singapore Sevens winners
The following Homeboyz players were part of the team that won the 2016 Singapore Sevens:

 
 Oscar Ayodi
 Alvin Otieno
 Lugonzo Ligamy

Rugby World Cup Sevens
The following Homeboyz players have represented Kenya at the Rugby World Cup Sevens:

 
 Michael Wanjala (2013)
 Oscar Ayodi (2018)
 Jeff Oluoch (2018)

Commonwealth Games
The following Homeboyz players have represented Kenya at the Commonwealth Games:

 
 Michael Wanjala (2014)
 Oscar Ayodi (2018)
 Jeff Oluoch (2018)

Youth Olympians
The following Homeboyz players were part of the Kenya Under 19 team that took part in the 2014 Summer Youth Olympics:

 
 Brian Songoi
 Nelson Sangura
 Brian Gisemba
 John Ochar
 Keith Wasike
 Daniel Abuonji
 Lamech Kimutai
 Ian Omondi

Overseas players
Note: Flags indicate national union as has been defined under World Rugby eligibility rules. 

  Solomon Okia: 2014–2016
  Eliphaz Emong: 2019–2020

References

Kenyan rugby union teams
Sport in Nairobi
Rugby clubs established in 2009
2009 establishments in Kenya